Barnabas is both a masculine given name and a surname. As a given name, it is a New Testament name which means "son of consolation". Variants of the name include Barnaby, and Barnabás, a Hungarian masculine given name.

People
Barnabas, born Joseph, first-century AD Christian disciple
Andrew Barnabas, video game music composer
John Barnabas (1929–1994), Indian evolutionary biologist
Levi Barnabas (born 1964), Canadian politician
Mathews Barnabas (1924–2012), Malankara Metropolitan
Yetunde Barnabas (born 1990), Nigerian model and actress
Vicent Barnabas (born 1985), Tanzanian footballer
Yusuf Barnabas Bala (1956–2021), Nigerian politician and architect
Barnabas Bidwell (1763–1833), American author, teacher, and politician
Barnabas Brough (c. 1795–1854), British merchant and accountant
Robert Barnabas Brough (1828–1860), English writer
Barnabas Burns (1817–1883), American lawyer, businessman, and politician
Barnabas Sibusiso Dlamini (1942–2018), Prime Minister of Eswatini
Sibusiso Dlamini (born 1980), Swazi footballer
Barnabas Eldridge (1843–1911), American industrialist
Barnabas Enjoy (born 1980), Cook footballer
Barnabas Fung (born 1960), Hong Kong judge
Barnabas Andyar Gemade (born 1948), Nigerian politician
Barnabas Geevarghese, Metropolitan
Barnabas Gooch (died c. 1926), English lawyer and academic
Barnabas Gunn (c. 1680–1753), English organist and composer
Barnabas R. Halem 'Imana (1929–2016), Ugandan priest
Barney Hopkinson (born 1939), Anglican priest
Barnabas Imenger (1975–2021), Nigerian footballer
Barnabas Imenger (born 1991), Nigerian footballer, son of the footballer born 1975
Barnabas Kelet Henagan (1798–1855), physician and governor of South Carolina
Barnabas Kinyor (born 1961), Kenyan athlete
Bart Latuheru (born 1965), Dutch footballer
Barnabas Long (fl. 1683–1865), Archdeacon of Cleveland
Barnabas Lindars (1923–1991), English scholar
Barnabas McDonald (1865–1929), Brother of the Christian Schools
Barnabas Muturi Mwangi, Kenyan politician
Barnabas Nawangwe (born 1956), Ugandan architect and academic
Barnabas O'Brien (died 1657), 6th Earl of Thomond
Barnabas Oley (1602–1686), English churchman and academic
Barnabas Root, (died 1877), Sierra Leonean reverend
Barnabas A. Samatta (born 1940), Tanzanian lawyer
 Barnabas Scudamore (1609–1651), English soldier
Barnabas Suebu (born 1946), Indonesian governor of province Papua
Barney White-Spunner (born 1957), British Army officer
Barnabas Wood (1819–1875), American dentist and inventor
Barnabas Zhang (1882–1961), Chinese churchman

Fictional characters
Barnabas Collins, vampire in the soap opera Dark Shadows

See also
Barnabus (disambiguation)
Barry (name)

References